In quantum field theory and statistical mechanics, the 1/N expansion (also known as the "large N" expansion) is a particular perturbative analysis of quantum field theories with an internal symmetry group such as SO(N) or SU(N).

This technique is used in QCD (even though  is only 3 there) with the gauge group SU(3). Another application in particle physics is to the study of AdS/CFT dualities.

It is also extensively used in condensed matter physics where it can be used to provide a rigorous basis for mean-field theory.

Example
Starting with a simple example — the O(N) φ4 — the scalar field φ takes on values in the real vector representation of O(N). Using the index notation for the N "flavors" with the Einstein summation convention and because O(N) is orthogonal, no distinction will be made between covariant and contravariant indices. The Lagrangian density is given by

where  runs from 1 to N. Note that N has been absorbed into the coupling strength λ. This is crucial here.

Introducing an auxiliary field F;

In the Feynman diagrams, the graph breaks up into disjoint cycles, each made up of φ edges of the same flavor and the cycles are connected by F edges (which have no propagator line as auxiliary fields do not propagate).

Each 4-point vertex contributes λ/N and hence, 1/N. Each flavor cycle contributes N because there are N such flavors to sum over. Note that not all momentum flow cycles are flavor cycles.

At least perturbatively, the dominant contribution to the 2k-point connected correlation function is of the order (1/N)k-1 and the other terms are higher powers of 1/N. Performing a 1/N expansion gets more and more accurate in the large N limit.  The vacuum energy density is proportional to N, but can be ignored due to non-compliance with general relativity assumptions.

Due to this structure, a different graphical notation to denote the Feynman diagrams can be used.  Each flavor cycle can be represented by a vertex.  The flavor paths connecting two external vertices are represented by a single vertex.  The two external vertices along the same flavor path are naturally paired and can be replaced by a single vertex and an edge (not an F edge) connecting it to the flavor path.  The F edges are edges connecting two flavor cycles/paths to each other (or a flavor cycle/path to itself).  The interactions along a flavor cycle/path have a definite cyclic order and represent a special kind of graph where the order of the edges incident to a vertex matters, but only up to a cyclic permutation, and since this is a theory of real scalars, also an order reversal (but if we have SU(N) instead of SU(2), order reversals aren't valid).  Each F edge is assigned a momentum (the momentum transfer) and there is an internal momentum integral associated with each flavor cycle.

QCD

QCD is an SU(3) gauge theory involving gluons and quarks.  The left-handed quarks belong to a triplet representation, the right-handed to an antitriplet representation (after charge-conjugating them) and the gluons to a real adjoint representation.  A quark edge is assigned a color and orientation and a gluon edge is assigned a color pair.

In the large N limit, we only consider the dominant term. See AdS/CFT.

References

Quantum field theory
Quantum chromodynamics
String theory
Statistical mechanics